Kenswick is a large neighborhood located in an Unincorporated area of Harris County, Texas, United States. The neighborhood is just north of Houston and west of Humble, Texas. Kenswick is served by Aldine Independent School District. 

Geography of Harris County, Texas
Greater Houston